Matthew I may refer to:

Matthew I Csák (fl. 1245)
Pope Matthew I of Alexandria (r. 1378–1408)
 Matthew I of Constantinople, Ecumenical Patriarch of Constantinople from 1397 to 1410